Azad (lit. Independent) is a 2018 melodrama film directed and written by Rehan Sheikh, who co-produced with Hasan Naeem under the production banner of Bling Studios and Roomi Films. The film features Sanam Saeed, Salman Shahid, Rehan Sheikh, Nimra Bucha and Sabreen Hasbani Zahid Ahmed and Sajjad Kishwar. The cast also includes debutants Ajlal Shah and Jawad Rana. A special appearance is also made by Angeline Malik, Imran Abbas and Schumaila Hussain.

Cast
 Rehan Sheikh
 Salman Shahid
 Sanam Saeed
 Sabreen Hisbani
 Nimra Bucha
Ajlal Shah
 Zahid Ahmed
Jawad Rana
Sajjad Kishwar
 Angeline Malik (special appearance)
 Imran Abbas as Faris (special appearance)
Schumaila Hussain (special appearance)

Production

Marketing
The first teaser of the film was released on September 2015. The second teaser was released on December 2015 by Bling Studios on Vimeo. It had its world premiere on 15 December 2017, in HBO's South Asian International Film Festival.

Soundtrack
The music of the film is composed by Taimoor Mirza and the background score is given by Abbas Ali Khan.

Release
The film was released in cinemas across Pakistan on 9 February 2018. On 15 December 2017, the film along with 2017's Na Maloom Afraad 2 had its screened at the South Asian International Film Festival 2017.

See also
List of Pakistani films of 2018

References

External links

2017 films
2010s Urdu-language films
Pakistani comedy-drama films
2017 comedy-drama films